Erich Hänzi (born 27 April 1965) is a retired Swiss football defender and later manager.

References

1965 births
Living people
Swiss men's footballers
BSC Young Boys players
FC Lausanne-Sport players
Association football defenders
Swiss Super League players
Swiss football managers
FC Zürich managers
BSC Young Boys non-playing staff